Blondie Meets the Boss is a 1939 American comedy film directed by Frank R. Strayer and starring Penny Singleton and Arthur Lake.

Based on the Chic Young comic strip of the same name, the film is the second in the Blondie series, which eventually grew to 28 films.

Plot
A frustrated Dagwood resigns his office job, but Blondie is fortunately able to take over his position.  Dagwood leaves their toddler unattended at home to go on a short fishing trip with a friend at a cabin, and is uneasy and skittish when he finds his friend has brought along two attractive young women. Adding to the chaos, after Dagwood returns home, Blondie's sister and her boyfriend come to stay with them in order to enter a jitterbug championship at the nightclub Mr. Dithers needs for a building project. Dagwood, on short notice, substitutes in the dance contest after his sister-in-law's boyfriend backs out, and performs amazing acrobatic dance steps.  A jealous Blondie, seeing pictures of the fishing trip, packs her bags with the intention of leaving Dagwood, but changes her mind. In the confusion, they neglect to buy Mr. Dithers the nightclub, which actually turns out to be fortuitous.

Cast

 Penny Singleton as Blondie Bumstead
 Arthur Lake as Dagwood Bumstead
 Larry Simms as Baby Dumpling Bumstead
 Jonathan Hale as J.C Dithers
 Danny Mummert as Alvin
 Daisy as Daisy the Dog
 Dorothy Moore as Dot Miller
 Don Beddoe as Marvin Williams
 Dorothy Comingore as Francine Rogers
 Stanley Brown as Ollie Shaw
 Joel Dean as Freddie Turner
 Richard Fiske as Nelson
 Inez Courtney as Betty Lou Wood
 Patti Lacey as featured swing dancer
 Ray Hirsch as featured swing dancer
 Skinnay Ennis as himself
 Barbara Kent as Jitterbugger (*UK actress born 1921, not silent star Barbara Kent)
 Eddie Acuff as Pots and Pans Peddler
 Irving Bacon as 1st Letter Carrier
 George Chandler as Laundry Worker 
 Wallis Clark as Henry W. Philpot 
 William B. Davidson as Older Man in Café
 Edgar Dearing as Officer McGuire
 Jay Eaton as Wilson
 Sarah Edwards as Salesperson
 Edward Gargan as Garden Café Doorperson
 David Newell as Sanders
 Walter Sande as 2nd Letter Carrier	
 Grady Sutton as Camera Store Clerk

Production
Production for the film took place in December 1938 to January 1939, and had the working title Blondie Steps Out.

References

External links
 
 
 
 

1939 films
1939 comedy films
Columbia Pictures films
Films directed by Frank R. Strayer
Blondie (film series) films
Films scored by Leigh Harline
American black-and-white films
1930s English-language films
1930s American films